MKHS may refer to:

 Mark Keppel High School, Alhambra, California, United States
 Morris Knolls High School, Morris County, New Jersey, United States